The 1983 Maryland Terrapins football team represented University of Maryland in the 1983 NCAA Division I-A football season. The Terrapins offense scored 316 points while the defense allowed 253 points. Led by head coach Bobby Ross, the Terrapins appeared in the Florida Citrus Bowl.

Schedule

Clemson was under NCAA probation and was ineligible for the ACC title. Therefore, this game did not count in the league standings.

1984 NFL Draft
The following players were selected in the 1984 NFL Draft.

References

Maryland
Maryland Terrapins football seasons
Atlantic Coast Conference football champion seasons
Maryland Terrapins football